During World War II, the United States Army Air Forces (USAAF) established numerous airfields in Indiana for training pilots and aircrews of USAAF fighters and bombers.

Most of these airfields were under the command of the First Air Force or the Army Air Forces Training Command (AAFTC), a predecessor of the current Air Education and Training Command of the United States Air Force.  However the other USAAF support commands—Air Technical Service Command (ATSC); Air Transport Command (ATC) or Troop Carrier Command—also commanded a significant number of airfields in support roles.

It is still possible to find remnants of these wartime airfields. Many were converted into municipal airports, some were returned to agriculture, and several were retained as United States Air Force installations and were front-line bases during the Cold War. Hundreds of the temporary buildings that were used survive today and are being used for other purposes.

Major Airfields 

 Troop Carrier Command
 Baer Army Air Base, Fort Wayne
 I Troop Carrier Group
 45th Army Air Force Base Unit
 Now:  Fort Wayne Air National Guard Station 
 Stout Field AAF, Indianapolis
 Headquarters, Troop Carrier Command, Glider Ferrying & Pickup facility
 I Troop Carrier Group
 362d Army Air Force Base Unit
 Used by Indiana Air National Guard until 1961. Now closed and part of urbanized Indianapolis area

Air Transport Command
 Bendix Field AAF, South Bend
 Now: South Bend Regional Airport 

Air Technical Service Command
 Evansville MAP, Evansville
 Now: Evansville Regional Airport 
 Freeman Army Airfield, Seymour
 Southeast Training Center
 447th Army Air Force Base Unit
 Now: Freeman Municipal Airport 

Army Air Force Training Command
 Atterbury Army Airfield, Columbus
 Sub-base of George AAF, Illinois (now: Lawrenceville-Vincennes International Airport )
 304th Army Air Force Base Unit
 Now: Columbus Municipal Airport 

Other
 Note:  Bunker Hill Air Force Base / later Grissom Air Force Base, now Grissom Air Reserve Base, was a United States Navy airfield known as Naval Air Station Bunker Hill during World War II.

References

External links

 01
World War II
Airfields of the United States Army Air Forces in the United States by state
United States World War II army airfields